Bloodstorm can refer to:

BloodStorm, an arcade game
Bloodstorm (book), a novel by Heather Gladney
Bloodstorm (comics), one of two Marvel Comics fictional characters
Bloodstorm (Marvel Comics), an alternate rendition of X-Men character Storm
Batman: Bloodstorm, a DC Comics graphic novel
Subspecies 4: Bloodstorm, a horror film
Bloodstorm, the UK DVD title for Nazis at the Center of the Earth